AirTran Airways is a defunct North American low cost airline.

AirTran may also refer to:
 AirTran Holdings, a former airline holding company
 AirTran JetConnect, an outsourced and defunct brand operated by Air Wisconsin
 Vought Airtrans, a defunct automated people mover system